The Early Childhood Development Agency (Abbreviation: ECDA; ; ;) is an Autonomous Agency that manages the early childhood education sector in Singapore. It oversees the development of childcare centres and kindergartens. The agency is jointly overseen by the Ministry of Social and Family Development and the Ministry of Education, with it being housed in the former.

History 
The idea of having an agency for early childhood was first proposed during the 2012 National Day Rally by Prime Minister Lee Hsien Loong as a statutory board, being part of a plan to raise early childhood education standards in Singapore. Before the agency was formed, kindergartens and childcare centres were managed by the Ministry of Education's Pre-school Education Branch and Ministry of Social and Family Development's Child Care Division respectively.

Following the announcement, the agency was formed on 1 April 2013.

Overview 
The agency's mission is "To Ensure Every Child Has Access To Affordable And Quality Early Childhood Development Services And Programmes", where the early childhood sector is of good quality and has good educators for each child. It mainly focuses on children under the age of 7.

See also 
 Child care
 Early childhood education
 Education in Singapore
 Kindergarten
 Ministry of Education (Singapore)
 Ministry of Social and Family Development

References

External links 
 Early Childhood Development Agency

2013 establishments in Singapore
Early childhood educational organizations
Education in Singapore
Government agencies established in 2013
Organizations established in 2013